Homoplectra is a genus of netspinning caddisflies in the family Hydropsychidae. There are about 11 described species in Homoplectra.

Species
These 11 species belong to the genus Homoplectra:
 Homoplectra alseae Ross, 1938
 Homoplectra doringa (Milne, 1936)
 Homoplectra flinti Weaver, 1985
 Homoplectra luchia Denning, 1966
 Homoplectra monticola (Flint, 1965)
 Homoplectra nigripennis (Banks, 1911)
 Homoplectra norada Denning, 1975
 Homoplectra oaklandensis (Ling, 1938)
 Homoplectra schuhi Denning, 1965
 Homoplectra shasta Denning, 1949
 Homoplectra spora Denning, 1952

References

Further reading

 
 
 

Trichoptera genera
Articles created by Qbugbot